Drift, Kentucky is an unincorporated community and coal town in Floyd County, Kentucky, United States. As of the census of 2000, there were 569 people living in the ZIP Code Tabulation Area (ZCTA) for Drift's ZIP code (41619).

Drift is located at  (37.4803778, -82.7476587) at an elevation of 715 feet (218 m).

A post office was established in the community in 1909. The origins of the name Drift are unclear: it may have been named for a local mine or for driftwood found in a nearby creek.

References

Unincorporated communities in Floyd County, Kentucky
Unincorporated communities in Kentucky
Coal towns in Kentucky